Buffer may refer to:

Science
 Buffer gas, an inert or nonflammable gas
 Buffer solution, a solution used to prevent changes in pH
 Buffering agent, the weak acid or base in a buffer solution
 Lysis buffer, in cell biology
 Metal ion buffer
 Mineral redox buffer, in geology

Technology and engineering
 Buffer (GIS), a HASS zone around a map feature
 Buffer (optical fiber), a GG component of a fiber optic cable
 Buffer (rail transport), a device that cushions impacts between vehicles
 Buffer amplifier, an isolating circuit used in electronics or telecommunications
 Buffer stop, a device that keeps rail vehicles on tracks
 Buffer wheel, a device used to smooth a workpiece's surface
 Digital buffer, an electronic circuit used to isolate the input from the output
 Floor buffer, an appliance used to polish hard floors
 Optical buffer, a device that stores optically transmitted data
 Recoil buffer, a firearm component
 Seismic buffers, protect structures against the effects of earthquakes

Computing
 Buffer (application), a software application for managing social network accounts
 Data buffer, memory used temporarily to store output or input data while it is transferred.
 Framebuffer, a type of data buffer for use in graphical display
 Memory buffer register, the connection between processor and memory

People
 Bruce Buffer (born 1957), American sports announcer for UFC events
 Michael Buffer (born 1944), American ring announcer for boxing and wrestling events

Other uses
 Buffer (navy), a colloquial title
 Buffer state, a country separating two rival or hostile powers, thought to prevent conflict between them
 Buffer zone, a region separating two areas, possibly to segregate or conjoin them
 Buffering (horse), an Australian thoroughbred
 Buffering (TV series), a British TV series

See also
 Buff (disambiguation)